Maurelio Scanavini or Scannavini (Ferrara, May 7, 1665 – June 1, 1698) was an Italian painter of the Baroque period, mainly active in Ferrara.

Biography
He trained as a fresco painter with Francesco Ferrari in Ferrara, then spent some time in Bologna, where he worked as an oil canvas painter under Carlo Cignani, at a time when Giacomo Parolini was also a pupil. He was a friend of the painter Baruffaldi. He is called the Leccardino and Laderchi recounts a small scandal when Scanavini painted a dog licking himself in a canvas, afterwards obscured, for the Oratory of San Crispino.

He is said to have died from melancholy from lack of payment for his work. Barotti quotes: "poverty and misfortune, who accompanied him wherever he went, were the reasons for his death".

References

1665 births
1698 deaths
17th-century Italian painters
Italian male painters
Painters from Ferrara
Italian Baroque painters